The list of ship decommissionings in 1985 includes a chronological list of all ships decommissioned in 1985.


See also

1985
 
Ship